The gens Menenia was a very ancient and illustrious patrician house at ancient Rome from the earliest days of the Roman Republic to the first half of the fourth century BC. The first of the family to obtain the consulship was Agrippa Menenius Lanatus in 503 BC.  The gens eventually drifted into obscurity, although its members were still living in the first century BC.

Origin
During the first secession of the plebs in 493 BC, Agrippa Menenius Lanatus, the former consul, was despatched by the Senate as an emissary to the plebeians, who were gathered on the Mons Sacer.  He said that he was sprung from the plebs, although he and several generations of his descendants held the consulship at a time when it was open only to the patricians.  This suggests that the Menenii must have been made patricians, probably during the reign of one of the later Roman kings.

Praenomina
The Menenii are known to have used the praenomina Agrippa, Gaius, Titus and Lucius.  Together with the gens Furia, they were amongst the only patrician families to make regular use of the praenomen Agrippa, which was later revived as a cognomen in many families.  For this reason, later sources erroneously refer to members of this gens as Menenius Agrippa.

Licinus, the praenomen of one of the Menenii, was likewise a rare name, meaning upturned.  Like Agrippa, Licinus was later known primarily as a surname, but it is most frequently confused with the nomen Licinius, which was probably derived from it, although perhaps connected to the Etruscan lecne, which seems to have been its equivalent.  Livy preserves the praenomen as Licinius, but later historians appear to have amended it to the more common praenomen Lucius.

Branches and cognomina
The only cognomen associated with the Menenii is Lanatus.  This surname is derived from the Latin adjective, meaning "wooly", and perhaps originally referred to a person with particularly fine, curly, or abundant hair.

Members
 Gaius Menenius Lanatus, father of the consul of 503 BC.
 Agrippa Menenius C. f. Lanatus, consul in 503 BC, and emissary to the plebeians during the first secession in 493.
 Titus Menenius Agripp. f. C. n. Lanatus, consul in 477 BC, failed to intervene on behalf of the Fabii at the Battle of the Cremera.
 Agrippa Menenius Agripp. f. C. n. Lanatus, father of the consul of 452 BC.
 Titus Menenius Agripp. f. Agripp. n. Lanatus, consul in 452 BC.
 Lucius Menenius T. f. Agripp. n. Lanatus, possibly consul in 440 BC.
 Agrippa Menenius T. f. Agripp. n. Lanatus, consul in 439 BC, and consular tribune in 419 and 417 BC.
 Titus Menenius T. f. Agripp. n. Lanatus, father of the consular tribune of 387 BC.
 Licinus Menenius T. f. T. n. Lanatus, consular tribune in 387, 380, 378, and 376 BC.
 Menenius, proscribed by the triumvirs in 43 BC, but rescued from death by the self-devotion of one of his slaves.

See also
 List of Roman gentes

Footnotes

References

Bibliography

 Diodorus Siculus, Bibliotheca Historica (Library of History).
 Titus Livius (Livy), Ab Urbe Condita (History of Rome).
 Dionysius of Halicarnassus, Romaike Archaiologia.
 Appianus Alexandrinus (Appian), Bellum Civile (The Civil War).
 Aulus Gellius, Noctes Atticae (Attic Nights).
 Joannes Zonaras, Epitome Historiarum (Epitome of History).
 Luigi Lanzi, Saggio di Lingua Etrusca e di Altre Antiche d'Italia (The Study of Etruscan and other Ancient Italian Languages), Stamperia Pagliarini, Rome (1789).
 Dictionary of Greek and Roman Biography and Mythology, William Smith, ed., Little, Brown and Company, Boston (1849).
 George Davis Chase, "The Origin of Roman Praenomina", in Harvard Studies in Classical Philology, vol. VIII (1897).
 

 
Roman gentes